Vítor Hugo Correia Ladeiras (born 10 April 1992) is a Portuguese footballer who plays for União Desportiva Alta de Lisboa as a midfielder.

Club career
Born in Sintra, Lisbon District, Ladeiras spent eight years in C.F. Estrela da Amadora's youth system after joining at the age of 10. He started his senior career with neighbouring Real SC, in the fourth division.

In June 2013, Ladeiras signed with Singaporean club Tampines Rovers FC after a short trial, being joined in the adventure by countrymen Diogo Caramelo and André Martins. He scored his first as a professional on 20 September, playing the full 90 minutes and contributing to a 3–1 home win against Tanjong Pagar United FC.

References

External links

1992 births
Living people
People from Sintra
Portuguese footballers
Association football midfielders
C.F. Estrela da Amadora players
Real S.C. players
Singapore Premier League players
Tampines Rovers FC players
Portuguese expatriate footballers
Expatriate footballers in Singapore
Portuguese expatriate sportspeople in Singapore
Sportspeople from Lisbon District